Pluto's Cave (or Pluto Cave) is a partially collapsed lava tube on the northern outskirts of Mount Shasta in the Klamath National Forest. Its main entrance is located close to the 99-97 Cutoff  North-east of Weed and  East-southeast of Grenada. The tube is roughly 190,000 years old, which is quite old for a lava tube, as they normally collapse quickly (in geological terms), having ceilings only a few metres thick. However, Pluto's Cave is located in a semi-arid climate, where erosion is restricted, which contributes to its survival.

The cave was discovered in the spring of 1863 by Nelson Cash, who came upon it while looking for stray cattle. It was further explored in April 1863, and named "Pluto's Cave" after Pluto, the Greek God of the underworld.

William Henry Brewer assisted by Clarence King on a field trip for the California Division of Mines and Geology (predecessor of today's California Geological Survey), visited the cave on October 10, 1863. Brewer writes about it a month later on November 11:

King in 1870, now a director of the Geological Exploration of the Fortieth Parallel, returned to Mount Shasta, and with a fellow explorer revisited the cave, which King recounts in his 1872 book Mountaineering in the Sierra Nevada:

John Muir explored the Mount Shasta area in the winter of 1874–75, and includes the cave on his Shasta circumnavigation guide:

Evidence was found of its use by Pre-Columbian peoples.

References

External links 
 USGS Mineral resources
 Edgewood Estates
 Photos
 Show Caves

Lava tubes
Caves of California
Landforms of Siskiyou County, California
Mount Shasta
Klamath National Forest